"Idlewild Blue (Don'tchu Worry 'Bout Me)" is the third single released from American musical duo OutKast's sixth studio album, Idlewild, and the first from the album that is sung by André 3000. Andre also plays the guitar for the song, using the standard 12-bar blues. The song tells the story of a character wishing to gain his independence by leaving the familiarity of his family, friends and town. The video shows Andre and the band playing in an old house during a thunder storm, with people dancing around him. The building slowly fills with rain water, and by the end of the video, everything in the house is underwater. Because of the proximity in which the video was filmed, some viewers interpret the video to be a visual allusion to the New Orleans flooding following Hurricane Katrina, while others think the water represents the "blues" that can flood over someone's life.  The end of the video features a text that reads, "Dedicated to all those tryin' to stay afloat."

Track listings
CD single
 "Idlewild Blue (Don'tchu Worry 'Bout Me)" – 3:24
 "She Lives in My Lap" (featuring Rosario Dawson) – 4:29

Promo
 "Idlewild Blue (Don'tchu Worry 'Bout Me)" (main version) – 3:24
 "Idlewild Blue (Don'tchu Worry 'Bout Me)" (clean version) – 3:24
 "Idlewild Blue (Don'tchu Worry 'Bout Me)" (instrumental) – 3:24

Charts

References

External links

2006 singles
Music videos directed by Paul Hunter (director)
Outkast songs
Songs written by André 3000